Madeline Piujuq Ivalu is a Canadian Inuk filmmaker and actor from Igloolik, Nunavut. One of the cofounders of Arnait Video Productions, a women's video and filmmaking collective in Nunavut, she co-directed, co-wrote and starred in Arnait's first feature film production, Before Tomorrow (Le Jour avant le lendemain). She costarred in the film with her real-life grandson, Paul-Dylan Ivalu. Her codirector of the film was Marie-Hélène Cousineau, and both women cowrote the film with Susan Avingaq.

She garnered three Genie Award nominations at the 30th Genie Awards, for Best Performance by an Actress in a Leading Role, Best Achievement in Direction and Best Adapted Screenplay. Ivalu and Cousineau also codirected the 2013 film Uvanga, in which Ivalu played a supporting role.

She has also acted in the films Atanarjuat: The Fast Runner, The Journals of Knud Rasmussen, The Grizzlies and Angakusajaujuq: The Shaman's Apprentice, and was one of the credited writers of The Journals of Knud Rasmussen. With Cousineau, she also wrote and directed the films Uvanga and Restless River.

References

External links

Canadian film actresses
Canadian women film directors
Canadian women screenwriters
Canadian Inuit women
Actresses from Nunavut
Writers from Nunavut
Inuit actresses
Inuit writers
Living people
People from Igloolik
Inuit filmmakers
21st-century Canadian actresses
Year of birth missing (living people)
21st-century Canadian screenwriters
Inuit from the Northwest Territories
Inuit from Nunavut
Film directors from Nunavut
21st-century Canadian women writers
Film producers from Nunavut